The Exposition Internationale de l’habitation et de l’urbanisme was a specialised exhibition recognised by the  Bureau International des Expositions (BIE), which held in the French capital Paris between July 10 and August  15 in 1947.
It focused on housing estate projects in the context of post-war reconstruction and attracted 14 participating countries including Mexico, Poland  and South Africa.

External links
Official website of the BIE

World's fairs in Paris
1947 in Paris